Planotortrix flammea is a species of moth of the family Tortricidae. It is endemic to New Zealand.

Taxonomy 
This species was first described in 1956 by John Salmon using a specimen collected by him at Homer Forks Fiordland in mid January. Salmon named the species Bactra flammea. In 1966, John S. Dugdale placed this species with the genus Planotortrix.

Description

The colour pattern of the adults is purple brown or orange brown. There is a dark purple brown dot in the forewing disc. The hindwings are whitish ochreous with a distinct purple or orange fringe. It has been noted that the type population is more orange in appearance other populations.

Distribution 
This species is endemic to New Zealand. It can be found in Gisborne, Taupo, Taranaki, Nelson, Buller, North and Mid Canterbury, Mackenzie country and Fiordland. The species inhabits coastal to alpine habitat.

Habitat and host species
The larvae feed on Veronica odora, Veronica salicifolia, Veronica stricta and Veronica subalpina. Other hosts include Veronica elliptica and Veronica pauciramosa.

References

External links 

 Image of holotype specimen held at Te Papa Tongarewa

Moths described in 1956
Archipini
Moths of New Zealand
Endemic fauna of New Zealand
Endemic moths of New Zealand